The Polish Basketball Federation (abbreviated to PZKosz), is a governing body for basketball in Poland. It directs and oversees all of the basketball national teams of Poland, including both the junior and senior national teams of both men and women.

History
The Polish Association of Sports Games was founded in 1928, and became a member of FIBA in 1934. In 1957, the Polish Basketball Federation was then founded.

External links
Official website 

Basketball governing bodies in Europe
Federation
Basketball
Sports organizations established in 1957
1957 establishments in Poland